Gustav Adam Maass Jr. (1893–1964) was an American architect working primarily in the Mediterranean Revival style who designed public buildings and private homes in and around Palm Beach, Florida, from the 1920s until his death in 1964.

Early life and education

Gustav Maass was born in New Orleans, the third of eight children of German immigrants. His father was a mechanical engineer. Maass grew up in New Orleans and Birmingham, Alabama. He received a degree in architecture from the University of Pennsylvania in 1917, and worked during World War I in the U.S. Civil Service at League Island Navy Yard in Philadelphia. After the war, Maass returned to Birmingham, where he designed a variety of structures, including a Masonic Temple, power plants, schools, churches, and houses.

Palm Beach

In 1921, Maass joined Harvey and Clarke in West Palm Beach, where he participated in the design of many buildings in Delray Beach in the 1920s; his Art Deco style was reflected in commercial buildings along Atlantic Avenue. Maass was responsible for the design of several railroad stations on Florida’s east and west coasts, including:
 Deerfield Beach Seaboard station, 1300 West Hillsboro Boulevard, Deerfield Beach, Florida (1927), NRHP-listed
 Delray Beach Seaboard Air Line Railway Station (1927), NRHP-listed
 Fort Lauderdale station (1927)
 Homestead Seaboard station (1927)
 Hollywood station (Florida) (1928)
Maass was partners with John L. Volk from 1927 to 1935 in Palm Beach, when he started his own firm. He designed the American Red Cross building in West Palm Beach and the original Rehabilitation Center for Children and Adults facility in Palm Beach and he also redesigned the interior of the First Presbyterian Church, West Palm Beach.

The Palm Beach Town Council has designated several Maass-designed houses as landmarks to be preserved, many of which were in the Mediterranean Revival style featuring simple windows, barrel clay tile roofs, and stucco exteriors. Maass also used Neo-Classical and Colonial Revival styles.

See also
Mediterranean Revival
Palm Beach, Florida

References

Notes

Sources

 Koskoff, Sharon. Art Deco of the Palm Beaches. Charleston, SC: Arcadia, 2007.
 Marconi, Richard A., and Debi Murray. Palm Beach. Charleston, SC: Arcadia, 2009.

External links
Palm Beach County History Online: People of Palm Beach County - Gustav Adam Maass, Jr.
Gustav Maass-designed Ta-boó on Worth Avenue harkens to Palm Beach as eclectic resort

Gallery

1893 births
1964 deaths
Mediterranean Revival architects
People from Palm Beach County, Florida
20th-century American architects
American railway architects
Seaboard Air Line Railroad
Architects from Florida